Catherine Irving (born 1990) is a New Zealand beauty queen. She was crowned Miss Wanganui 2009 and went on to compete in and win Miss Earth New Zealand 2009, an annual national beauty pageant promoting environmental awareness. Irving represented New Zealand in the Miss Earth 2009.

Background
Irving is the youngest of seven children all born and brought up in the small country town of Waverly, Wanganui, New Zealand. Irving's mother is of Spanish descent and her father, Sid Irving, is of Māori (the indigenous Polynesian people of New Zealand) and Pākehā or European heritage. She studied communications and public relations at the Massey University in Palmerston North. She has toured New Zealand with a Hip Hop and Salsa dance troupe and regularly teaches salsa to children in Waverley.

Pageants

Miss Earth New Zealand 2009
Irving was declared Miss Earth New Zealand 2009 in Auckland on 5 September 2009.  She was the fifth Manawatū-Whanganui resident to be declared Miss Earth New Zealand in six years.

In the last round of the Miss Earth New Zealand 2009 competition, she was asked in the final question and answer segment, "If there was one famous New Zealander you could talk to, who would it be?" She replied: "John Key because he's the one who has the most influence in New Zealand and is making the decisions. I'd ask him what he plans to do about a number of environmental issues like recycling and carbon emissions."

Miss Earth 2009
Irving represented New Zealand in the 9th edition of Miss Earth, which was held at the Boracay Convention Center in the Philippines between 1–22 November 2009.

Cameos
Catherine Irving appeared in an episode of TV3's 'Missing Pieces' as an extra working in the Wanganui gym.

References

External links
Miss Earth New Zealand official website
Miss Earth official website
Woman of the Earth

1990 births
Living people
Miss Earth 2009 contestants
Miss New Zealand winners